Etheostoma osburni, the candy darter or finescale saddled darter, is a species of fish in the family Percidae, a member of the group known as darters. This species is endemic to the eastern United States where it is known only from the Kanawha River system in the states of Virginia and West Virginia.

Description
This species has a lifespan of up to three years. It spawns in April and May. It is an invertivore, feeding on aquatic insect larvae and water mites.

Habitat and distribution
Etheostoma osburni lives in a system of rivers, streams, and creeks in the central Appalachian Mountains. It can be found in rapid riffles in rocky riverbed habitat. It occurs in cold, cool, and warm waters, as long as the substrate is rocky and the water is clear. It tolerates fast currents.

Conservation
Etheostoma osburni has a limited range, it has been recorded in more than 10 locations and does not have a severely fragmented distribution, so it has been designated a near-threatened species on the IUCN Red List. In 2018, US Fish and Wildlife Service designated it as a federally protected endangered species.< It is probably declining, however, due to threats from human activity. It prefers clear, unsilted waters, and increases in silt and sediment may reduce populations by reducing tolerable habitat.

Taxonomy and etymology
Etheostoma osburni was first formally described as Poecilichthys osburni in 1932 by the American ichthyologists Carl Leavitt Hubbs and Milton Bernhard Trautman With the type locality given as Stony Creek which is a tributary of the Greenbrier River in Pocahontas County, West Virginia. The specific name honors the American zoologist Raymond Carroll Osburn (1872-1955). The candy darter is considered to be closely related to the variegated darter (E. variatum).

See also
Etheostoma osburni

References

Further reading

Kessinger, Brin E., "Utilizing conservation genetics as a strategy for recovering the endangered Candy Darter (Etheostoma osburni) in West Virginia" (2020). Graduate Theses, Dissertations, and Problem Reports. 7670.
https://researchrepository.wvu.edu/etd/7670

Leftwich, K. N., et al. (1996). The candy darter (Etheostoma osburni) in Stony Creek, George Washington–Jefferson National Forest, Virginia. Trout Predation, Distribution, and Habitat. Center for Aquatic Technology Transfer, USDA Forest Service.
Dunn, C. G. (2017) Habitat and Imperilment of the Candy Darter Etheostoma osburni in the New River Drainage, USA, Master of Science Thesis, Virginia Tech.

Fish of the United States
osburni
Taxa named by Carl Leavitt Hubbs
Fish described in 1932
Taxonomy articles created by Polbot